Juan Pablo "Rimpy" Puyat Bondoc is a Filipino politician who served as a deputy speaker and member in the House of Representatives of the Philippines representing the 4th district of Pampanga. He was also a deputy majority leader of the House of Representatives.

Education 
Bondoc attended Xavier School for his primary and secondary education, and the University of the Philippines for Business Administration and Harvard University for his Masters in Public Administration.

Political career 
Bondoc is a member of the Partido Demokratiko Pilipino-Lakas ng Bayan Party of President Rodrigo Duterte.

He entered politics in 1998, when he was elected as representative of the 4th district of Pampanga.

Personal life
Bondoc is a member of Upsilon Sigma Phi.

References 

Year of birth missing (living people)
Living people
PDP–Laban politicians
University of the Philippines alumni
Harvard Kennedy School alumni